Evol (stylized in all caps) is the fourth studio album by American rapper Future. It was released on February 6, 2016, through A1 Recordings and Freebandz, and distributed by Epic Records. The album features a sole guest appearance from the Weeknd. It premiered on DJ Khaled's We The Best Radio debut on Beats 1. Evol released five months after the collaborative mixtape What a Time to Be Alive (2015) and a month after Purple Reign (2016). Production was handled by frequent collaborators Metro Boomin, Southside, TM88 and DJ Spinz, among others.

Evol was supported by two singles: "Low Life" and "Wicked". The album received generally positive reviews from critics and debuted at number one on the US Billboard 200. It also debuted at number one on the US Top R&B/Hip-Hop Albums.

Background and release
On December 25, 2015, The Weeknd released a collaborative song with Future, titled "Low Life", on SoundCloud. It was produced by Metro Boomin and Ben Billions and co-produced by The Weeknd. The song was later revealed to be included on Evol. On March 1, 2016, "Low Life" was released as the album's first single. A music video for the track premiered on MTV on the same month.

On February 1, 2016, DJ Khaled announced that he would be premiering Future's fourth album on the debut show of We The Best Radio on Beats 1. Future then announced the album title, release date and artwork, as well as individually tweeting the track list.

The album cover artwork was created by the Polish creative production studio Ars Thanea. The album's title is love spelled backwards.

Critical reception

Evol was met with generally positive reviews. At Metacritic, which assigns a normalized rating out of 100 to reviews from mainstream publications, the album received an average score of 68, based on 17 reviews. The aggregator AnyDecentMusic? gave it 6.8 out of 10, based on its assessment of the critical consensus.

In his review, Craig Jenkins of Billboard states, "The spite of 2014 mixtape Monster, the woe of 2015's Beast Mode, and the devilish glee of his No. 1 album DS2 have all chilled into a dull malaise here". He concluded with "Evol doesn't break any rules or set many new ones, but as the latest in a seemingly never-ending series of wonders Future and his team wield in their creation of druggy, downcast afterparty dispatches, it is a joy". Matthew Ramirez of Pitchfork found that while Evol "has slightly more misses than hits, the highs are high—arguably higher than Purple Reigns". Sheldon Pearce of Consequence said, "It's an extraordinary triumph of ambitious trap soundscapes and an excellent complement for a driven artist, a man no longer inhibited by loss. With every passing release, Future grows more confident, and more callous". Dean Van Nguyen of Clash said, "Again Future marshals the glittering soundscapes expertly, his tuneful flow reining in the beats while imbuing all the fragility, heartsickness and aggression that make it the most impressive instrument in rap right now". Israel Daramola of Spin said, "EVOL, along with the Purple Reign mixtape, doesn't provide that instant hit that Future's world-class 2015 was so full of. Instead it crawls into your brain and makes itself at home; you'll find yourself going back to it over and over without even realizing".

Chris Gibbons of XXL said, "EVOL is only the latest building block on one of the most impressive runs from any rapper we've seen, and Future shows no signs of slowing down for anything". Grant Rindner of The Line of Best Fit said, "Odds are Future will drop another project or five between now and the end of the calendar year, so while EVOL is ultimately dispensable it's still a pretty good time". Shirley Ju of HipHopDX said, "As it stands, EVOL is nothing out of the ordinary from his past endeavors. With no measures in place preventing from Future releasing new full-length projects, this album could easily be surpassed in a month or two". Lanre Bakare of The Guardian said, "The formula is working, but for fans using his albums as a way in, they're missing a big part of what makes Future so intriguing". Brian Duricy of PopMatters said, "EVOL doesn't stand up to his critical peaks, but this could easily be seen as but a release to tide fans over before the next blockbuster". Andy Gill of The Independent said, "His raps here still stick fairly closely to the trap-music conventions that have dominated the hip-hop scene in Future's hometown Atlanta for the past decade or so".

Commercial performance
Evol debuted at number one on the US Billboard 200 with 134,000 album-equivalent units; it sold 100,000 copies in its first week, and boasted over 25 million streams. Evol is the third project by Future to debut on the Billboard 200 at number one in seven months. As of March 2016, the album has sold 125,000 copies domestically. As of May 2018, the album has been certified platinum by the Recording Industry Association of America (RIAA) for shipments of 1,000,000 units in the United States.

Track listing

Sample credits
 "Wicked" contains a sample of "Kanet Rohi", written by Özcan Deniz and performed by Rayan.

Charts

Weekly charts

Year-end charts

Certifications

Release history

References

2016 albums
Future (rapper) albums
Albums produced by Zaytoven
Albums produced by Southside (record producer)
Albums produced by Metro Boomin
Albums produced by TM88